Dzerzhinsky District is the name of several administrative and municipal districts in Russia.  The districts are generally named for Felix Dzerzhinsky, the founder of the Cheka.

Districts of the federal subjects

Dzerzhinsky District, Kaluga Oblast, an administrative and municipal district of Kaluga Oblast
Dzerzhinsky District, Krasnoyarsk Krai, an administrative and municipal district of Krasnoyarsk Krai

City divisions
Dzerzhinsky City District, Nizhny Tagil, a city district of Nizhny Tagil, a city in Sverdlovsk Oblast
Dzerzhinsky City District, Novosibirsk, a city district of Novosibirsk, the administrative center of Novosibirsk Oblast
Dzerzhinsky City District, Orenburg, a city district of Orenburg, the administrative center of Orenburg Oblast
Dzerzhinsky City District, Perm, a city district of Perm, the administrative center of Perm Krai
Dzerzhinsky City District, Volgograd, a city district of Volgograd, the administrative center of Volgograd Oblast
Dzerzhinsky City District, Yaroslavl, a city district of Yaroslavl, the administrative center of Yaroslavl Oblast

Historical districts
Dzerzhinsky District, Saint Petersburg, a former district of the federal city of St. Petersburg merged into newly created Tsentralny District in March 1994

See also
Dzerzhinsky (disambiguation)
Dzerzhinsk (disambiguation)

References